The 2600-series is a series of Chicago "L" car built between 1981 and 1987 by the Budd Company of Philadelphia, Pennsylvania. 600 cars were built, and 507 of them remain in service.

History
The 2600-series cars (numbered 2601–3200) were manufactured by the Budd Company, the same company that made the 2200-series. The fourth of five series of Chicago "L" cars known as the High Performance Family, they are quite similar in design to the earlier 2400-series cars. The cars were first delivered to the CTA in 1981, in time for the upcoming O'Hare Airport extension of the Kennedy Line (now known as the northwestern end of the Blue Line). Originally, an order was made for 300 cars, but this order was later increased to 600 cars, all of which were delivered from 1981 until 1987. They were the last railcars to be built by the Budd Company, later renamed to Transit America. The cars were rebuilt by Alstom of Hornell, New York, from 1999 until 2002.

Currently, these cars make up most of the Blue Line fleet and the entire Orange Line fleet, with some cars also assigned to the Brown Line. Car 3458 can be found on the Brown Line. Additionally, Car 3458 is also retrofitted with LED signs to synchronized gracefully with its mate 3457(3200 series).  In June 2014, as more 5000-series cars were being delivered, CTA began to transfer the Red Line's 2600-series cars to the Blue Line due to them being newer than the existing 2600-series Blue Line cars, transferring the Blue Line's older 2600-series cars to the Orange Line as an interim replacement for its 2400-series cars until the Red and Purple Lines are fully equipped with the 5000-series cars. Beginning in October 2014, CTA has also started to transfer some of the Red Line's 2600-series cars to the Orange Line to replace the rest of its 2400-series cars until the Red and Purple Lines are fully equipped with the 5000-series cars. However, since the delivery of all 5000-series cars is complete, the assignment of 2600-series cars on the Orange Line is now a permanent assignment until the delivery of the new 7000-series cars.

From 1993 until 2015, these cars were used on the Red Line. These cars were removed from service from the Red Line in 2015 and replaced by the 5000-series cars, with its 2600-series cars being reassigned to the Blue and Orange Lines.

When the Yellow Line was converted to third rail power in 2004, the Yellow Line was usually operated with these cars from 2010 until 2014 when they were replaced by the 5000-series cars.

When the Pink Line began service in June 2006, its fleet consisted mostly of these cars with the 2200-series cars. These cars were removed from service from the Pink Line on June 8, 2012 and were replaced by the 5000-series cars, with most of its 2600-series cars being reassigned to the Blue Line to replace its 2200-series cars.

From October 2013 until March 2015, some of these cars were also reassigned from the Red Line to the Purple Line as an interim replacement for its 2400-series cars, with these cars making up the majority of the Purple Line fleet until May 2014 when most were phased out in favor of the 5000-series cars. These cars were used on the Purple Line from 1993 until 2015.

In September and October 2018, several of these cars on the Blue Line were transferred to the Orange and Brown Lines in exchange for the 3200-series cars. The Orange Line now operates entirely with the 2600-series cars.

These cars were used for the West-Northwest, Lake/Dan Ryan, Howard/Englewood/Jackson Park, Ravenswood, and Evanston routes.

These cars have been used for all 8 "L" lines of the Chicago "L" system, although those that operated on the Green Line were usually borrowed cars from other lines.

300 of the 2600-series cars went out of service during the blizzard of 1999; the rehab of the 2600-series cars began shortly after the blizzard, with the first rehabbed cars going into service in March 1999. The rehab was completed in October 2002.

Budd/Transit America had completed car 3200 on April 3, 1987. Car 3200 was not only the final railcar of the 2600-series order, but was the final railcar to be constructed by Budd/Transit America; once the order was completed, Budd shut down its railcar business.

Accidents
 On March 15, 1988, car 3031 derailed and was damaged after hitting the Wilson station platform after splitting a switch. Car 3032 was renumbered 3458 and paired with new 3200-series car 3457 in 1994.
On September 30, 2013, a 2600-series train collided at Harlem on the Forest Park branch, injuring 33 people. Cars 3171 and 3177 were damaged from the collision.
On March 24, 2014, a 2600-series train overran the buffer at the O'Hare station, injuring 32 people. Cars 3061 and 3062 were damaged from the accident.

Retirement
The 2600-series cars currently in service are set to be replaced by the new 7000-series cars.

Part of car 2753 survives in the Bulls and Blackhawks Madhouse Team Store.

See also
 R62 (New York City Subway car)
 R62A (New York City Subway car)

References

Chicago "L" rolling stock
Budd multiple units
Train-related introductions in 1981